Ballard C. Campbell is an American historian.

Campbell is a 1962 graduate of Northwestern University.  He holds an M.A. (1964) in history from Northeastern University and a Ph.D. (1970) from the University of Wisconsin, Madison.  He is Professor in the Department of History and Professor of Public Policy, the Law, and Society Program at Northeastern University.

Books

 Disasters, Accidents, and Crises in American History, (Facts OnFile, New York. February, 2008)Editor and Author
 American Presidential Campaigns and Elections (Armonk, NY: MESharpe, 2003, 3 volumes), co-edited with William G. Shade.
 The Human Tradition in the Gilded Age and Progressive Era (Wilmington, DE: Scholarly Resources, 2000. Rowman and Littlefield assumed imprint.). Editor and contributor, volume of original essays.
 The Growth of American Government: Governance from the Cleveland Era to the Present(Bloomington, IN: Indiana University Press, 1995).
 Representative Democracy: Public Policy and Midwestern Legislatures in the late Nineteenth Century (Cambridge, MA:Harvard University Press, 1980

Notes

Historians of the United States
Northeastern University faculty
Northwestern University alumni
University of Wisconsin–Madison alumni
Living people
Year of birth missing (living people)
21st-century American historians
21st-century American male writers
American male non-fiction writers